Patriot High School may refer to:

Patriot High School (California), located in Riverside, California
Patriot High School (Virginia), Prince William County, Virginia